Clag  may refer to:
Clag (glue), an Australian brand, made by Bostik
Clag, railway terminology for the exhaust emissions of certain locomotives
Clag (card game), a trick-taking card game
A common name for a horse-fly